George Franklin Gillette (May 9, 1878 – March 7, 1944) served in the California State Assembly for the 67th district from 1931 to 1933 and during the Spanish–American War he served in the United States Army. Born in Henry County, Missouri, Gillette died on March 7, 1944.

References

1878 births
People from Henry County, Missouri
1944 deaths
American military personnel of the Spanish–American War
Republican Party members of the California State Assembly
20th-century American politicians